Vello Rummo (15 May 1921 Nõmmküla, Raikküla Parish – 24 November 2009 Pärnu) was an Estonian theatre director and pedagogue.

During World War II, he was mobilized into the Red Army and belonged to 8th Estonian Rifle Corps. In 1953 he graduated from Lunacharsky State Institute for Theatre Arts' (GITIS) Estonian studio. From 1945 until 1949, he worked at Estonian Radio. From 1955 until 1961, he was the chief director and artistic manager of Eesti Televisioon. In 1957, was one of the founders of the Tallinn State Conservatory 's Department of Performing Arts and for more than ten years was a lecturer with the institution.

From 1969 until 1982, he was the chief stage manager at Endla Theatre in Pärnu and from 1982 until 1995, was the theatre's general director.

Rummo was married to stage, film and television actress Linda Rummo (née Kald).

Awards:
 1975: Estonian SSR merited art personnel

Productions of plays

 Rozov's "Õnn kaasa!" (1955)
 Bernstein's "West Side’i lugu" (1964, diploma work at Estonia Theatre)
 Blažek's and Rychman's "Humalakorjajad" (1967, diploma work at Estonian Youth Theatre)

References

1921 births
2009 deaths
Estonian theatre directors
Academic staff of the Estonian Academy of Music and Theatre
Soviet military personnel of World War II
People from Rapla Parish
Soviet theatre directors